The Solomon Islands Independence Medal  was created in 1978 to commemorate the transition from self-government to the full independence of the Solomon Islands.  It is a part of the Solomon Islands honours system.

Description
The medal is round, made of silver coloured metal.  The obverse bears the Cecil Thomas portrait of Queen Elizabeth II, surrounded by the inscription Elizabeth II Dei Gratia Regina F:D:.  The reverse bears the Coat of Arms of the Solomon Islands surrounded by the inscription Solomon Islands Independence Medal 1978.  The medal is held by a ring suspension to a ribbon of equal stripes of blue, yellow, white, yellow, and green.

Order of precedence

Recipieints

Orders, decorations, and medals of the Solomon Islands
Awards established in 1978
1978 establishments in the Solomon Islands